Chetiri Bandere Monument (English: Four Pools) (Macedonian Cyrillic: Четири бандере) is a monument in Kumanovo, North Macedonia.

See also
Kumanovo

References

Monuments and memorials in North Macedonia
Buildings and structures in Kumanovo